The Tivington Nott is a novel by the Australian author Alex Miller and is based on the lives of real people in Somerset on the borders of Exmoor. Miller tells his own story of a young labourer swept up in the adventure of riding second horse in a west country stag hunt. The Tivington Nott was first published by Robert Hale (UK) in 1989 and was republished by Allen & Unwin (Australia) in 2005.

Awards and nominations
1989 Winner, Braille Book of the Year Award

Reviews
Peter Pierce, 2004, 'The solitariness of Alex Miller', Australian Literary Studies, 21 (3). pp. 299–311  accessed January 2014.
'Altogether brilliant. This man knows his hunting country.' - Somerset County Gazette

Interviews
Jane Sullivan, 'Interview: Alex Miller', 'The Sydney Morning Herald', October 5, 2013, accessed January 2014.

References

Novels by Alex Miller
Novels set in Somerset
1989 novels
Robert Hale books